The median alveolar cyst is a rare cyst, occurring in the bony alveolus between the maxillary central incisors.  It is distinguished from a periapical cyst by the fact that adjacent teeth are vital.

Treatment
Treatment is by enucleation, or surgical removal.

References

Cysts of the oral and maxillofacial region